A glockenspiel is installed at 190 E. Charles Street in Mt. Angel, Oregon, United States. The glockenspiel is housed in a  tower and features wood carvings of community members. A musical routine occurs four times daily.

In 2016, figurines representing the six military branches replaced the regular statues temporarily.

References

External links
 Mount Angel, Oregon: The Glockenspiel at Roadside America
 Glockenspiel, Mount Angel, OR at Waymarking

Buildings and structures in Marion County, Oregon
German-American culture in Oregon
Mt. Angel, Oregon
Tourist attractions in Marion County, Oregon